Thomas William Fraser-Holmes (born 9 October 1991) is an Australian swimmer who made his international debut in 2010. He was an Australian Institute of Sport scholarship holder.

At the 2010 Commonwealth Games, he won individual bronze in the men's 200 m freestyle, and gold with the Australian men's 4 x 200 m freestyle relay team.

He competed at the 2012 Summer Olympics in the men's 200 m freestyle, the 400 m individual medley and the 4 x 200 m freestyle relay.

At the 2014 Commonwealth Games, he won the men's 200 m freestyle, won silver in the men's 400 m individual medley and was part of the Australian team that won gold in the men's 4 x 200 m freestyle relay in a Games record.

In 2015, he set a national record in the men's 400 m medley in the short course, he set the long course record in 2013.  In 2015, he was also part of the Australian team that won bronze in the 4 x 200 m relay at the World Championships.

At the 2016 Summer Olympics, Fraser-Holmes represented Australia in the 400 m individual medley, the 200 m freestyle, and the 4 × 200 m freestyle relay.

In June 2017, Fraser-Holmes was banned for 12 months by FINA for missing three drug tests in a one-year period.

On his return, he won silver in the men's 400 m individual medley at the short course World Championships.

At the 2019 World Championships, Fraser-Holmes was part of the Australian men's 4 x 200 m freestyle team that won gold.

See also
List of Commonwealth Games medallists in swimming (men)

References

External links
 
  (archive 2)
 
 
 
 

1991 births
Living people
Australian Institute of Sport swimmers
Australian male medley swimmers
Australian male freestyle swimmers
Commonwealth Games gold medallists for Australia
Commonwealth Games bronze medallists for Australia
Swimmers at the 2010 Commonwealth Games
Swimmers at the 2012 Summer Olympics
Olympic swimmers of Australia
Swimmers at the 2014 Commonwealth Games
Sportspeople from Newcastle, New South Wales
World Aquatics Championships medalists in swimming
Swimmers at the 2016 Summer Olympics
Commonwealth Games medallists in swimming
21st-century Australian people
Medallists at the 2010 Commonwealth Games
Medallists at the 2014 Commonwealth Games